Cristian Anderson Penilla Caicedo (born 2 May 1991) is an Ecuadorian football midfielder who plays for Serie A side,  Club Deportivo Cuenca.

Club career
Penilla joined Barcelona in January 2013 from Deportivo Quito, one year after he left ESPOLI for Deportivo Quito. In his first season with Barcelona he scored six goals out of 32 league games. On December 24, 2014, it was confirmed that Penilla would join Pachuca.

On January 23, 2018, Penilla was loaned to the New England Revolution of Major League Soccer. Penilla contributed 12 goals and 7 assists and was named Midnight Riders Man of the Year. New England made his move permanent at the end of their 2018 season.

International career
Penilla was called for Friendlies against United States and El Salvador on October 10 and 14th, 2014 respectively. Penilla made his debut for Ecuador against the United States on October 10, 2014.

International goals
Scores and results list Ecuador's goal tally first.

Career statistics

Club

National team

References

1991 births
Living people
Sportspeople from Esmeraldas, Ecuador
Association football midfielders
Ecuadorian footballers
Liga MX players
Major League Soccer players
C.D. ESPOLI footballers
S.D. Quito footballers
Barcelona S.C. footballers
C.F. Pachuca players
Atlético Morelia players
New England Revolution players
Associação Chapecoense de Futebol players
Ecuadorian expatriate footballers
Ecuadorian expatriate sportspeople in Mexico
Ecuadorian expatriate sportspeople in the United States
Ecuadorian expatriate sportspeople in Brazil
Expatriate footballers in Mexico
Expatriate footballers in Brazil